Givaldo is a given name. Notable people with the name include:

 Givaldo (footballer) or Givaldo Bezerra Cordeiro (born 1935), Brazilian footballer
 Givaldo Barbosa (born 1954), Brazilian tennis player

See also
 Giraldo